Éric Laurent (born 1947) is a French journalist known for his work on the finance and geopolitics of the oil business and for his work on Morocco and its government.

According to Edwin McDowell, writing in the "Book Notes" column of The New York Times, Pierre Salinger and Éric Laurent's 1991 book Secret Dossier: The Hidden Agenda Behind the Gulf War, was "already a best seller in France" at the time, and that the book "contends that the United States Government helped undercut efforts by King Hussein of Jordan to find a nonmilitary solution after President Saddam Hussein invaded Kuwait. It also claims to show how war could have been avoided."

According to Aurelian Breeden, writing for The New York Times, Laurent has "established a reputation" as a "fierce critic" of the Moroccan leadership.  Per the same source, he was arrested in August 2015 (along with co-author Catherine Graciet) for allegedly accepting a bribe to not publish books about the Moroccan leadership ever again.  Both authors "do not deny that a financial transaction took place", but that it was either "a trap" or "a private transaction."

On March 15, 2023, Éric Laurent and Catherine Graciet, were sentenced in Paris to a one-year suspended prison sentence and a fine of 10,000 euros.

Books
 Secret Dossier; The Hidden Agenda Behind the Gulf War, 1991, with Pierre Salinger
 Hassan II: la memoire d'un roi: Entretiens avec Eric Laurent 1993
 Bush's Secret World: Religion, Big Business and Hidden Networks, 2004
 La face cachée du 11 Septembre, 2004
 Le roi prédateur, 2012, with Catherine Graciet

References

20th-century French journalists
21st-century French journalists
20th-century French essayists
21st-century French essayists
1947 births
Living people
Place of birth missing (living people)